Eastern Counties 2 is an English level 10 Rugby Union League - currently divided into 3 regional divisions (north, south, west). Promoted teams move up to Eastern Counties 1 with teams in this league tending to be from Cambridgeshire, Norfolk or Suffolk. Currently a three divisions, Eastern Counties 2 has previously been divided into North and South divisions with teams from Essex taking part, and had relegation to Eastern Counties 3. In 2003-04 the Essex teams broke away, forming a new league - with Essex 2 being the equivalent division to Eastern Counties 2.

In 2014-15 Eastern Counties 2 split into three regional divisions - north, south and west to allow for more 2nd and 3rd teams to take part.  Due to the reorganization of the divisions, relegation is now possible to Eastern Counties 3.

Participating Clubs 2013-14
Fakenham
Felixstowe
Hadleigh (relegated from Eastern Counties 1)
Haverhill & District	 	 
Mildenhall Red Lodge
Mistley
Norwich Medics
Norwich Union
Thetford
Thurston (relegated from Eastern Counties 1)

Participating Clubs 2012–13
Broadland – Great Yarmouth
Felixstowe
Haverhill & District	
Mildenhall Red Lodge
Mistley	
Norwich Medics
Norwich Union	
Sawston	
Swaffham
Thetford

Original teams
When league rugby began in 1987 this division contained the following teams:

Basildon
Braintree
Canvey Island 
Chelmsford
Diss
East London
Ilford Wanderers
Port of London Authority
Upminster
Wanstead 
Woodbridge

Eastern Counties 2 Honours

Eastern Counties 2 (1987–1993)

The original Eastern Counties 2 was a tier 9 league with promotion up to Eastern Counties 1 and relegation down to Eastern Counties 3.

Eastern Counties 2 (1993–96)

The creation of National 5 South meant that Eastern Counties 2 dropped from a tier 9 league to a tier 10 league for the years that National 5 South was active.  Promotion and relegation continued to Eastern Counties 1 and Eastern Counties 3 respectively.

Eastern Counties 2 (1996–2000)

The cancellation of National 5 South at the end of the 1995–96 season meant that Eastern Counties 2 reverted to being a tier 9 league.  Promotion continued to Eastern Counties 1, while relegation was to Eastern Counties 3, which would split into two regional divisions - north and south - ahead of the 1997–98 season.

Eastern Counties 2: North / South (2000–2003)

East Counties 2 was split into two regional divisions - north and south - and the introduction of London 4 North East ahead of the 2000–01 season meant the divisions dropped to become tier 10 leagues.  Promotion was to Eastern Counties 1 and relegation to Eastern Counties 3 - north or south.

Eastern Counties 2 (2003–2009)

Eastern Counties 2 re-merged into a single division ahead of the 2003–04 season, continuing to be a tier 10 league.  Promotion continued to Eastern Counties 1 and after the cancellation of Eastern Counties 3 at the end of the 2003–04 season, there was no relegation.

Eastern Counties 2 (2009–2014)

Eastern Counties 2 remained a tier 10 league despite national restructuring by the RFU.  Promotion continued to Eastern Counties 1 and there was no relegation.

Eastern Counties 2: North / South / West (2014–present)

Eastern Counties 2 was once again restructured - this time into three regional divisions - north, south and west.  It remained a tier 10 league with promotion to Eastern Counties 1 and the reintroduction of Eastern Counties 3 meant there was once again relegation to one of its regional divisions - north, south or west.

Promotion play-offs

From 2000 to 2002 there was a playoff between the runners-up of Eastern Counties 2 North and Eastern Counties 2 South for the third and final promotion place to Eastern Counties 1 with the team with the superior league record has home advantage in the tie.  The promotion playoffs were discontinued when a single Eastern Counties 2 division was created for the 2002–03 season.

Number of league titles

Cantabrigian (2) 
Hadleigh (2)
Ipswich Y.M. (2)
Thetford (2)
Wanstead (2)
Basildon (1)
Beccles (1)
Billericay (1)
Broadland - Great Yarmouth (1)
Bury St Edmunds III (1)
Campion (1)
Cantabrigian II (1)
Chelmsford (1)
Colchester (1) 
Colchester II (1)
Colchester III (1)
Cottenham Renegades (1)
Crusaders (1)
Diss (1) 
Diss II (1)
Fakenham (1)
Halstead Templars (1)
Harwich & Dovercourt (1)
Holt II (1)
Ilford Wanderers (1)
Maldon (1)
March Bears (1)
Mersea Island (1)
Met Police Chigwell (1)
Newmarket (1)
Old Edwardians (1)
Shelford IV (1)
Southwold (1)
Stanford Le Hope (1)
Stowmarket (1)
Swaffham (1)
Westcliff (1)
Woodbridge (1)
Wymondham (1) 
Wymondham II (1)

See also
London & SE Division RFU
Eastern Counties RU
Essex RFU
English rugby union system
Rugby union in England

Notes

References

E
Rugby union in Essex
Rugby union in Cambridgeshire
Rugby union in Norfolk
Rugby union in Suffolk